John Bryan Friel (August 26, 1898 – December 12, 1995) was an American college basketball coach, the head coach of the Washington State Cougars for 30 seasons, from 1928  He holds the school record for victories by a men's basketball coach with 495, and led Washington State to the NCAA tournament championship game in 1941. He was later the first commissioner of the Big Sky Conference.

Friel played college basketball at Washington State before becoming a high school coach. In 1928, he was named the head coach of Washington State. His teams won one Pacific Coast Conference championship and three divisional titles. Friel officiated college football games and was head coach of the Cougars baseball team from 1943 to 1945.

Early years
Born in Waterville, Washington, Friel enrolled at Washington State College in 1916, then served in Europe during World War I.  He returned to Pullman after the war and was the captain of the basketball team, playing at forward and earning all-conference honors in 1922. He claimed six varsity letters, and in 18 starts as a baseball pitcher had a win–loss record of 15–1.

High school coach
Following graduation in 1923, Friel coached high school basketball, first at Colville, then at North Central in Spokane, winning the state title in his third and final season at North Central.

Washington State
He became the head basketball coach at his alma mater in 1928, and his team posted a 9–14 record in his first season. Washington State increased its victory total each of the next three seasons, winning 22 games in 1931–32. The Cougars won at least 20 games in 10 of Friel's 30 seasons as head coach, and had 21 winning seasons. The 1940–41 team was Friel's only one to make the NCAA Tournament.  One of three Washington State teams to win a Pacific Coast Conference divisional championship under Friel, the 1940–41 Cougars won the conference title, and won two games in the NCAA Tournament to advance to the final, where they lost 39–34 to Wisconsin. Friel has been credited as helping to change free throw rules in college basketball. In addition to his duties as basketball coach, Friel was Washington State's baseball head coach from 1943 to 1945 and a college football official; he was originally selected to officiate the 1942 Rose Bowl, but his basketball schedule prevented him from serving as referee.

After the early 1950s, his Cougar teams struggled, failing to post a winning record following a 19–16 mark in 1951–52; in November 1957, Friel announced that he would retire at the end of the season. Friel had the eighth-most wins among Division I men's college basketball coaches when he retired. He remained with the school into the 1960s, continuing as golf coach and in the physical education program.

The court inside Beasley Coliseum, the Cougars' home arena, was named after Friel in April 1977, as announced by university President Glenn Terrell at a meeting of the board of regents; the dedication ceremony was at halftime on  The following year, Friel was among the first to be inducted into Washington State's Athletic Hall of Fame.

Conference work
Friel was a supervisor for the Pacific-10 Conference's basketball officiating bureau and spent eight years as the first commissioner of the Big Sky Conference, beginning in 1963. Into the 1980s, Friel continued working for the Pac-10, evaluating officials.

Death
Friel died at the age of 97 in Pullman on December 12, 1995, due to pneumonia. In 2003, he was inducted into the Pac-10 Basketball Hall of Honor. That summer, his widow Catherine died at age 101.

Head coaching record

See also
 List of NCAA Division I Men's Final Four appearances by coach

References

External links

1898 births
1995 deaths
American men's basketball coaches
American men's basketball players
Basketball coaches from Washington (state)
Basketball players from Washington (state)
Big Sky Conference commissioners
Forwards (basketball)
High school basketball coaches in the United States
People from Waterville, Washington
Washington State Cougars baseball coaches
Washington State Cougars baseball players
Washington State Cougars men's basketball coaches
Washington State Cougars men's basketball players